The Cone Gatherers (also The Cone-Gatherers) is a novel by the Scottish writer Robin Jenkins, first published in 1955.

The background to the novel comes from Jenkins' own wartime experience as a conscientious objector doing forestry work.

Plot summary
Two brothers, Calum (a simple-minded hunchback) and Neil, are working in the forest of a  Scottish country house during five autumn days (Thursday to Monday) in 1943, gathering cones that will replenish the forest which is to be cut down for the war effort. The harmony of their life together is shadowed by the obsessive hatred of Duror, the gamekeeper, who since childhood has disliked anything he finds "mis-shapen". We also learn that because of his wife's illness where she lies in her bed all day growing larger, he relates to Calum in the sense of his deformity and thus conveys a reason why he grew so much resentment towards him.

Lady Runcie-Campbell, the aristocratic landowner, dislikes having the two brothers on the estate, and tries to avoid communicating with them. She is embarrassed by her son, Roderick, who is friendly and welcoming to the brothers.

The obsession Duror has for the brothers grows stronger, leading to the climax, when Lady Runcie-Campbell discovers Calum hanging dead from a tree, having been shot by Duror, who subsequently shoots himself.

Major themes
The novel covers several themes, perhaps the most obvious being sacrifice; Neil's sacrifice for his brother, the sacrifice of the forest being cut down, and the ultimate sacrifice of Calum himself. There is close examination of good and evil, intertwined with Neil's jealousy and hatred for Lady Runcie-Campbell and her family, and in turn Lady Runcie-Campbell's jealousy and hatred for the two brothers working on the estate. Her turmoil between trying to appear to be Christian, and upholding her aristocratic background, recurs throughout the novel, which introduces the theme of religion. Another theme is class structure - Lady Runcie-Campbell believes she is above the lower subjects, Duror himself enjoys the small luxuries he is given because of his higher job of game keeper, but Neil hates the class structure: "we're human beings just like them". This carries on throughout the book, and at the end we can see that Lady Runcie Campbell might even have been able to stop the death of Calum. Yet another theme is nature. Calum himself is extremely close to nature - he does not feel close to the human world, but in nature he seems to coexist with it: "it was a good tree [...] with rests among its topmost branches as comfortable as chairs."

The situation between these characters within the grounds of the estate is a microcosm for the world at large, where dominating factions (Duror, Nazi regime) have decided to despise and want to get rid of those whom they deem inferior (Calum, Jews and other persecuted peoples in WW2). Duror also feels a similar sense of hatred and disgust for his ill wife, who has grown morbidly obese and does not fit his ideals. His disgust for both Calum and his wife contribute to his growing anger and resentment.

Symbolism
The novel is filled with heavy symbolism, including some of the following:
The woods, representing the Garden of Eden. While the outside world is filled with the death and destruction of the ongoing war, the woods are filled with life and colour.
Calum, embodying innocence and purity.
Duror, embodying darkness, and a parallel for the serpent in the Garden of Eden
Roderick, demonstrating social equality
Lady Runcie-Campbell & Neil, both epitomising their polarised views of the social class division
 The cones - symbolising renewal, regeneration 
Calum symbolising the crucifixion of Jesus - sacrificed himself to erase all human sins. Links to Calum's sacrifice as the break in divide of social class and war

Significance
The Cone Gatherers has sometimes been compared to John Steinbeck's Of Mice and Men due to the similarities in theme, plot and characters, although the novel grew directly out of Jenkins' personal experiences in the Second World War.

The novel is often used in Scottish secondary schools, where it is taught as part of the Higher English curriculum.

References 

1955 British novels
Scottish novels
Novels set in Scotland
Fiction set in 1943